Milenko Stojković (1769, Kličevac, Požarevac – 1831, Bakhchysarai, Crimea) was a Serbian revolutionary and bimbaša in the First Serbian Uprising early in the 19th century.  He is most famous for executing four dahije (renegade janissaries) tyrants during the start of the First Serbian Uprising, in vengeance for the "Slaughter of the Knezes".

Having apprehended and, while running away, Milenko executed the Turkish tyrants Aganlija, Kučuk Alija, Mula Jusuf, and Mehmed Fočić, responsible for the killing of Serbian Princes that triggered the First Serbian Uprising, on the island of Ada Kaleh on the River Danube.

He later fell out with Karageorge because of his extreme whimsicality and pride (he kept a harem of Moslem women for his sexual use, among other, purportedly because they were widows of slain Ottoman Turks and had no place to return to, which was very much frowned upon the Serbian Orthodox Church and other Uprising leaders), and evacuated to Russia, where he received a modest pension and died in Crimea.

See also
 List of Serbian Revolutionaries

Sources

1769 births
1831 deaths
Military personnel from Požarevac
People of the First Serbian Uprising
19th-century Serbian people
Serbian military leaders
People from Požarevac
Serbian expatriates in Russia